Song Kenan (born March 10, 1990) is a Chinese mixed martial artist who competes as a welterweight for the Ultimate Fighting Championship.

Early life and education
Song got into martial arts in fifth grade as he began training in traditional Chinese martial arts in his younger years. Song studied at the Hebei Locomotiva Technical College where he graduated as a welder.

Mixed martial arts career

Early career 
Song began his MMA career in 2014 and amassed a 12–4 record prior to signing with the UFC.

Ultimate Fighting Championship 
Song's UFC debut came at UFC Fight Night: Bisping vs. Gastelum on November 25, 2017, in Shanghai, China.  He faced Bobby Nash and won by a very quick KO, after clipping Nash with a right hand and finishing him with some ground strikes, declaring him the winner by KO in only 15 seconds. This win earned him the Performance of the Night bonus.

Song then had his second fight on June 23, 2018, against Hector Aldana at UFC Fight Night: Cowboy vs. Edwards. After a back and forth first round, Song connected with a right hand that dropped Aldana and followed with some extra strikes for the TKO win.

Song faced Alex Morono at UFC Fight Night: Blaydes vs. Ngannou 2 on November 24, 2018, in Beijing, China. He lost the fight via unanimous decision. The bout won Song his first Fight of the Night bonus.

Song faced Derrick Krantz on August 31, 2019, at UFC Fight Night 157. He won the fight via unanimous decision.

Song faced Callan Potter on February 23, 2020, at UFC Fight Night 168. He won the fight via knockout in the first round.

Song faced Max Griffin on March 20, 2021, at UFC on ESPN 21. He lost the fight via knockout in round one.

Song faced Ian Garry on March 4, 2023, at UFC 285. He lost the bout via TKO stoppage at the end of the third round.

Championships and accomplishments

Mixed martial arts
Ultimate Fighting Championship
Performance of the Night (One time) 
Fight of the Night (One time)

Mixed martial arts record

|-
|Loss
|align=center|19–7
|Ian Garry
|TKO (punches)
|UFC 285
|
|align=center|3
|align=center|4:22
|Las Vegas, Nevada, United States
|
|-
|Loss
|align=center|19–6
|Max Griffin
|KO (punches)
|UFC on ESPN: Brunson vs. Holland 
|
|align=center|1
|align=center|2:20
|Las Vegas, Nevada, United States
|
|-
|Win
|align=center|19–5
|Callan Potter
|KO (punches)
|UFC Fight Night: Felder vs. Hooker 
|
|align=center|1
|align=center|2:20
|Auckland, New Zealand
|
|-
|Win
|align=center|18–5
|Derrick Krantz
|Decision (unanimous)
|UFC Fight Night: Andrade vs. Zhang 
|
|align=center|3
|align=center|5:00
|Shenzhen, China
|
|-
|Loss
|align=center|17–5
|Alex Morono
|Decision (unanimous)
|UFC Fight Night: Blaydes vs. Ngannou 2 
|
|align=center|3
|align=center|5:00
|Beijing, China
|
|-
|Win
|align=center|17–4
|Hector Aldana
|TKO (punches)
|UFC Fight Night: Cowboy vs. Edwards
|
|align=center|2
|align=center|4:45
|Kallang, Singapore
|
|-
|Win
|align=center|16–4
|Bobby Nash
|KO (punches)
|UFC Fight Night: Bisping vs. Gastelum
|
|align=center|1
|align=center|0:15
|Shanghai, China
|
|-
|Win
|align=center|15–4
|Yerbota Yeluhan
|Submission (leg scissor choke)
|Chin Woo Men: 2016-2017 Season, Stage 5
|
|align=center|1
|align=center|2:13
|Guangzhou, China
|
|-
|Loss
|align=center|14–4 
|Brad Riddell
|TKO (punch to the body)
|Glory of Heroes 6
|
| align=center| 2
| align=center| 3:11	
|Shenzhen, China
|
|-
|Loss
|align=center|14–3 
|Elnur Agaev
|Decision (unanimous)
|Road FC 34
|
|align=center|3
|align=center|5:00
|Shijiazhuang, China
|
|-
|Win
|align=center|14–2 
|Gerhard Voigt
|Submission (guillotine choke)
|Rebel FC 4
|
|align=center|1
|align=center|1:35
|Qingdao, China
|
|-
|Win
|align=center|13–2
|Kenta Takagi
|TKO (punches)
|Superstar Fight: China vs Japan
|
|align=center|1
|align=center|3:04
|Changsha, China
|
|-
|Win
|align=center|12–2 
|Ooi Aik Tong
|TKO (punches)
|Bullets Fly Fighting Championship 4
|
|align=center|2
|align=center|2:25
|Beijing, China
|
|-
|Win
|align=center|11–2 
|Isamu Kanazawa
|TKO (punches)
|Worldwide MMA Alliance 
|
|align=center|1
|align=center|3:24
|Tokyo, Japan
|
|-
|Win
|align=center|10-2 
|Nosherwan Khanzada
|TKO (punches)
|CKF 4: Day 1
|
|align=center|1
|align=center|0:24
|Beijing, China
|
|-
|Win
|align=center|9–2 
|Zhao Zhang
|TKO (punches)
|CKF 3
|
|align=center|1
|align=center|3:03
|Xi'an, China
|
|-
| Loss
|align=center|8–2
|Israel Adesanya
|TKO (head kick)
|The Legend of Emei 3
|
| align=center| 1
| align=center| 1:59
|Shahe, China
|
|-
| Win
| align=center| 8–1 
| Makshati Sailik 
| Submission (guillotine choke)
| Rebel FC 3: The Promised Ones
| 
| align=center| 1
| align=center| 4:08
| Qian'an, China
|
|-
| Loss
| align=center| 7–1 
| Yincang Bao
| Decision (unanimous)
| CKF 3/13
| 
| align=center| 3
| align=center| 5:00
|Qian'an, China
|
|-
| Win
| align=center| 7–0
| Yonghau Xu
| Technical Submission (rear-naked choke)
| CKF 1/6
| 
| align=center| 3
| align=center| 2:51
| Qian'an, China
|
|-
| Win
| align=center| 6–0 
| Sanae Kikuta
| Decision (unanimous)
| Real 1
| 
| align=center| 2
| align=center| 5:00
| Tokyo, Japan
|
|-
| Win
| align=center| 5–0 
| Yubin Zhang 
| Submission (straight armbar)
| CKF 11/25
| 
| align=center| 1
| align=center| 1:54
| Qian'an, China
|
|-
| Win
| align=center| 4–0 
| Dacheng Liu
| Submission (armbar)
| CKF 10/27
| 
| align=center| 1
| align=center| 2:51
| Qian'an, China
|
|-
| Win
| align=center| 3–0 
| Habiti Tuerxunbieke 
| Submission (guillotine choke)
| CKF 10/14
| 
| align=center| 2
| align=center| 0:58
| Qian'an, China
|
|-
| Win
| align=center| 2–0 
| Nannan He
| TKO (retirement)
| CKF 9/2
| 
| align=center| 1
| align=center| 3:00
| Qian'an, China
|
|-
| Win
| align=center| 1–0 
| Wenshuo Guo
| Submission (rear-naked choke)
| CKF 7/22
| 
| align=center| 2
| align=center| 1:08
| Tangshan, China
|
|-
|}

References

External links 

Living people
1990 births
Chinese male mixed martial artists
Welterweight mixed martial artists
Sportspeople from Tangshan
Sportspeople from Hebei
Chinese sanshou practitioners
Chinese wushu practitioners
Ultimate Fighting Championship male fighters
Mixed martial artists utilizing sanshou